Río Blanco is a municipality  located in the montane central zone of the State of Veracruz, about 140 km from the state capital Xalapa. It has an area of 24.68 km2. The Decree of June 8, 1899 ordained that Tenango's municipal head-board create the municipality of Río Blanco designating it as Tenango de Río Blanco. In the same year French financiers initiated the construction of the largest textile factory in Latin America, which was inaugurated on October 9, 1892, by President Porfirio Díaz. One thousand seven hundred workers came to be employed at Rio Blanco, including only 60 women. See The Years with Laura Diaz by Carlos Fuentes for an account of the role of the Red Brigades at Rio Blanco as a key event in the Mexican Revolution.

Geographic Limits

The municipality of  Río Blanco  is delimited to the north by Ixhuatlancillo and Orizaba to the south-east by Rafael Delgado and to the west by Nogales.  The village of Tenango is very ancient and on the Independence having commemorated it constituted a municipality. On order of June 5, 1826 one declared that Huiloapan, Tenango and Nogales, they will have to form an alone municipality, but on November 4 24, 1859, the Minister of Government, it informed to the political chief that for instructions of the President of the Republic, the mentioned municipalities will have to remain again divided.

Agriculture

It produces principally maize, coffee, sugarcane and watermelon.

Celebrations

In  Río Blanco , in June takes place the celebration in honor to San Pedro y San Pablo, Patrons of the town, and in December takes place the celebration in honor to Virgen de Guadalupe.

Weather

The weather in  Río Blanco  is very cold and wet all year with rains in summer and autumn.

Relevant History

Río Blanco's company store was leased to Victor Garcín, a Barcelonnette who had been in the region for some decades since 1897.  He was already an important landowner in the Orizaba valley, since in that year CIVSA bought land from him to build a water
channel. Eduardo Garcín, his brother, was CIDOSA's manager in 1903 and a member of the CIDOSA board in the General Assembly minutes of 1905 and 1906.

The massacre of January 7 and 8 1907, known in Mexican history as the Río Blanco strike, put company stores in the Orizaba valley on the national front stage as one of the main causes of workers discontent.  Stores were the main target of workers’ attacks. This event was crucial in shaping the bad reputation of company stores during the Porfiriato. Thereafter, they became a symbol of both the injustices that prevailed during the period and workers’ opposition to it, a preamble to the Mexican Revolution.

References

External links 

  Municipal Official webpage
  Municipal Official Information

Municipalities of Veracruz